John Aalmo (7 August 1902 – 19 July 1981) was a Norwegian politician for the Conservative Party.

He was born in Aure as a son of teacher and mayor Ole Aalmo (1861–1943) and Gjertrud, née Rimstad (1876–1937). He spent most of his career, from 1958 to 1978, in Fosen Trafikklag. He was also a board member here as well as Fosen Aktie Dampskipsselskap.

Aalmo served as mayor of Sandstad from 1934 to 1957, and was a member of the county council during the same period. He served as a deputy representative to the Parliament of Norway from Sør-Trøndelag during the terms 1954–1957 and 1958–1961. In total he met during 95 days of parliamentary session.

References

1902 births
1981 deaths
People from Hitra
People from Aure, Norway
Deputy members of the Storting
Conservative Party (Norway) politicians
Mayors of places in Sør-Trøndelag